Ereboporus is a genus of predaceous diving beetles in the family Dytiscidae. There is one described species in Ereboporus, E. naturaconservatus, found in North America.

References

Further reading

 
 
 
 

Dytiscidae